Guzmán is a Spanish surname.

Guzmán may also refer to:

People with Guzmán as a given name
Guzmán Casaseca, Spanish soccer player, known as simply Guzmán
Guzmán Quintero Torres, Colombian journalist

Geographical features

Americas
Ciudad Guzmán, Jalisco, Mexico
Guzmán Basin, northern Mexico and the southern United States
Puerto Guzmán, Putumayo, Colombia
Santo Domingo de Guzmán (usually simply Santo Domingo), Dominican Republic
Guzmán, Coclé, Panama

Spain
Guzmán, Burgos, Spain
Castilleja de Guzmán, Seville, Spain
Toral de los Guzmanes, León, Spain

Other
 Castillo de Guzmán, a castle in Tarifa, Spain
 Guzmán de Alfarache, Spanish novel by Mateo Alemán
 Roman Catholic Diocese of Ciudad Guzmán, Jalisco, Mexico
 Estadio Mario Mercado Vaca Guzmán, a stadium in Potosí, Bolivia
 Gobernador Horacio Guzmán International Airport, an airport serving San Salvador de Jujuy, Argentina
 National University of Education Enrique Guzmán y Valle, a Peruvian university
 Prix Guzman, prize for interplanetary communication
 Sinaloa Cartel, a drug cartel sometimes called the Guzman-Loera Organization